Max Atkin (9 November 1924 – 15 December 2001) was an  Australian rules footballer who played with Geelong in the Victorian Football League (VFL).

Notes

External links 

1924 births
2001 deaths
Australian rules footballers from Victoria (Australia)
Geelong Football Club players
North Geelong Football Club players